New Centre-Right – Union of the Centre (NCD-UDC), was a centre-right political alliance in Italy, for the 2014 European election. NCD-UDC supports Jean-Claude Juncker, the candidate of the European People's Party for the European Commission presidency.

Overview
The alliance was formed on 6 April 2014, and it is composed by the following parties:

Electoral results

European Parliament

References

2014 disestablishments in Italy
2014 establishments in Italy
Defunct political party alliances in Italy
Parties represented in the European Parliament
Political parties disestablished in 2014
Political parties established in 2014